Radek Fiala (born February 9, 1986, in Brno, Czechoslovakia, now the Czech Republic) is a professional ice hockey goaltender playing for HC Litvínov, in the Czech Extraliga. He won the rookie of the year award in the Czech Extraliga during the 2005-06 season.

External links

Fiala at eurohockey.net

1986 births
Czech ice hockey goaltenders
Living people
Ice hockey people from Brno
HC Slovan Ústečtí Lvi players
HC Litvínov players
HC Most players
HC Berounští Medvědi players
SK Horácká Slavia Třebíč players